1996 ACC tournament may refer to:

 1996 ACC men's basketball tournament
 1996 ACC women's basketball tournament
 1996 ACC men's soccer tournament
 1996 ACC women's soccer tournament
 1996 Atlantic Coast Conference baseball tournament
 1996 Atlantic Coast Conference softball tournament